Pantelimon is a town in Ilfov County, Muntenia, Romania. Its name is derived from the Greek saint Panteleimon.

Geography
The town is situated in the middle of the Wallachian Plain.

The city borders to the southwest with Bucharest, to the west with Dobroești commune, to the northwest with the town of Voluntari, to the north with Afumați commune, to the northeast with Găneasa commune, to the east with Brănești commune, and to the south with Cernica and Glina communes.

The eastern part of Pantelimon is covered by the Cernica Forest, a remnant of the ancient Codrii Vlăsiei. The river Pasărea flows through the forest, forming the border with Brănești.

Local government
The last local election was on September 27, 2020. The Mayor (Primar) of Pantelimon is Marian Ivan (PNL). The Pantelimon Local Council has 19 councillors. The council has the following party composition:

Demographics
The town's population, according to the 2011 census, was 23,309 people, an increase from 16,019 persons in the 2002 census. In 2011, 93.2% of the population were ethnic Romanians, 5.9% Roma, and 0.9% others.

Natives
 Daniel Novac
 Nicolae Steinhardt

Transport

Pantelimon is traversed by national road DN3, which connects Bucharest to Călărași and Constanța to the east, and by Centura București, the ring road around the capital city. There is also a railroad station, serving the CFR Line 800, connecting Bucharest with the Black Sea coast at Mangalia.

The town is linked with Bucharest by small transport companies that operate minibuses from the town to several locations in Eastern Bucharest, where passengers can switch to RATB or the Bucharest Metro. Pantelimon metro station, the eastern starting point of the Bucharest Metro's M1 line, is located in the eastern extremity of Bucharest, near the Pantelimon town.

Economy

The city's economy is closely related to that of Bucharest; of the city's workforce, most work in the capital. There are also some local enterprises, such as the bread factory Titan, and the beer factory  owned by the United Romanian Breweries, which produces the Carlsberg and Tuborg beer brands.

Points of interest

On an island on the lake, the monastery has a cemetery where the writer Gala Galaction, the politician Pan Halippa,  the producer Marioara Murărescu, the actress Stela Popescu, the musician Johnny Răducanu the film director Geo Saizescu, the theologian Dumitru Stăniloae, the painter Ion Țuculescu, and the singer Zavaidoc are buried.

References

Towns in Romania
Populated places in Ilfov County
Localities in Muntenia